Martin Pierre Joseph Marsick (9 March 1847, in Jupille-sur-Meuse – 21 October 1924, in Paris), was a Belgian violin player, composer and teacher. His violin was made by Antonio Stradivari in 1705 and has since become known as the Ex Marsick Stradivarius. It was the instrument of David Oistrakh from 1966 to 1974. Marsick's nephew, Armand Marsick, the son of his brother Louis François, was a major violinist of the 20th century.

Biography

In 1854, seven-year-old Marsick was admitted to the Royal Conservatory of Music in Liège, to study violin with Désiré Heynberg (1831–1898). Graduating with the gold medal in 1864, he continued his studies in Brussels with Hubert Léonard and became the pupil of Joseph Massart at the Paris Conservatory in 1868.

In 1871, Marsick joined the newly established Société Nationale de Musique in Paris and also founded a string quartet. Between 1875 and 1895, he performed in concerts in collaboration with the leading conductors in Paris - Charles Lamoureux, Jules Pasdeloup, and Édouard Colonne, while also touring the rest of Europe and the United States.  He played additionally with Joseph Joachim and in a trio with the cellist Anatoliy Brandukov and the pianist Vladimir von Pachmann.

From 1892 until 1900, he was a professor at the Paris Conservatory, where his students included Carl Flesch, Jacques Thibaud, Cécile Chaminade and George Enescu. In 1900, he deserted his wife Berthe Marsick née Mollot (1848–1923; married 1872; divorced 1910) and his pupils and fled abroad with a married woman. Although the woman later rejoined her husband and Marsick returned to Paris in 1903, his professional career never recovered from the scandal and he died in poverty.

Selected works
Marsick published a series of finger exercises entitled Eureka in 1906 and his La Grammaire du violon appeared in 1924. Besides these, he composed the septet Souvenir de Naples for strings, flute, and clarinet; a piano quartet; and a lyric drama, Le Puits.

Stage
 Le Puits, Lyric Drama (c.1900); libretto by Auguste Dorchain

Chamber music
 Rêverie  in B major for violin and piano, Op. 4 (1879)
 2 Morceaux for violin and piano, Op. 6 (1879)
     Adagio
     Scherzando
 Pater noster, Prière for violin and piano with organ ad libitum, Op. 7 (1882)
 3 Pièces for violin or cello and piano, Op. 8 (1882)
     3. Capriccioso in A minor
 Airs de Ballet de Françoise de Rimini de Ambroise Thomas, 2 Transcriptions for violin and piano (1883)
     Adagio et Capriccio
     Pastorale, Scherzo, Habanera
 Rêverie No. 2 for violin and piano or string quartet, Op. 15 (1885)
 Songe for violin and piano, Op. 16 (1891)
 Tarentelle for violin and piano, Op. 19 (1897)
 Nocturne for violin and piano, Op. 20 (1897)
 Poème d'été for violin and piano, Op. 24 (1900)
     Captivante
     Exaltation
     Attente
     Valse triomphe
 Fleurs des cimes for violin and piano, Op. 25
 Valencia (au gré des flots) for violin and piano, Op. 26
 Les Hespérides for violin and piano, Op. 27
 Petites fleurs musicales de l'âme for violin and piano (1901)
 Petite romance expressive for violin and piano, Op. 32 (1901)
 Souvenir de Naples for 2 violins, viola, cello, double bass, flute and clarinet, Op. 33
 Piano Quartet for violin, viola, cello and piano, Op. 43
 Au pays du soleil, Poème for violin and piano

Pedigogical
 Eureka!, Mécanisme nouveau pour "se mettre en doigts" en quelques minutes (Eureka!, New Technical Exercises), Op. 34 (1905)
 La Grammaire du violon (1924)

References

External links

1847 births
1924 deaths
Belgian classical composers
Belgian male classical composers
Belgian classical violinists
Male classical violinists
Violin pedagogues
Conservatoire de Paris alumni
Academic staff of the Conservatoire de Paris
Composers for violin
Romantic composers
Royal Conservatory of Liège alumni
Musicians from Liège
20th-century Belgian male musicians
19th-century Belgian male musicians